Turban Geyser is a geyser in the Upper Geyser Basin of Yellowstone National Park in the United States.

Turban Geyser belongs to the Grand Group (or Grand Geyser Complex), and its eruption is tied to Grand Geyser.  In the hours prior to Grand's eruption, Turban will have five-minute eruptions every 15–25 minutes. These eruptions measure 5–10 feet (2–3 m) in height.  During Grand's eruption,  Turban erupts continuously reaching up to 20 feet (6 m).  Following an eruption of Grand, Turban will continue to erupt intermittently for an hour or so along with Vent Geyser.  At times, it is not possible to see Turban erupting through the steam and spray of Grand Geyser.

Turban Geyser was named for the similarity in appearance of the sinter deposits in its basin to the turban headpiece.  Dr. A.C. Peale named the geyser in 1872.

References

Geysers of Wyoming
Geothermal features of Teton County, Wyoming
Geothermal features of Yellowstone National Park
Geysers of Teton County, Wyoming